Eupithecia pinkeri is a moth in the family Geometridae. It is found in Anatolia and Transcaucasia.

References

Moths described in 1991
pinkeri
Moths of Asia